Thomas E. Pope (born July 24, 1962) is an American politician. He currently serves as speaker pro tempore within the South Carolina House of Representatives and since 2010 has served as a South Carolina House Member from the 47th District as a Republican.

Pope previously served as solicitor (equivalent to a district attorney) of the 16th Judicial Circuit in South Carolina, representing the people of Union and York counties from 1993 to 2006. Pope prosecuted Susan Smith in 1995 for the drowning death of her two children. He is currently a managing partner of Elrod Pope Law Firm in Rock Hill, South Carolina.

On February 6, 2017, Pope announced his intention to seek South Carolina's 5th congressional district seat in the upcoming special election, due to the resignation of Mick Mulvaney to become the Director of the Office of Management and Budget.

On May 2, 2017, Pope narrowly won the Republican primary for the U.S. congressional seat, leading by only 0.3%. On May 16, 2017, Pope lost the runoff against Ralph Norman by 200 votes, or 0.6%.

References

|-

|-

1962 births
21st-century American politicians
Living people
Republican Party members of the South Carolina House of Representatives
People from Seneca, South Carolina
People from Rock Hill, South Carolina
South Carolina state solicitors
University of South Carolina School of Law alumni